Lasiancistrus tentaculatus is a species of armored catfish found in the Orinoco River basin of Colombia and Venezuela.  This species grows to a length of  SL.

References
 

Ancistrini
Freshwater fish of Colombia
Fish of Venezuela
Fish described in 2005